The following is a list of affiliates of Create, a PBS sub-channel network of non-commercial educational television stations in the United States. The list is arranged alphabetically by state and based on the station's city of license and followed in parentheses by the designated market area and when different from the city of license. In most cases, this is their virtual channel number and a cable channel number with Cable Provider in the United States, with their video quality and aspect ratio size by U.S. State.

Major stations are in Bold.

Alabama 
 Alabama Public Television
Birmingham – WBIQ 10.3/Brighthouse Cable 350
Demopolis – WIIQ 41.3
Dozier – WDIQ 2.3
Florence – WFIQ 36.3
Huntsville – WHIQ 25.3/Comcast 201
Louisville – WGIQ 43.3
Mobile – WEIQ 42.3
Montgomery – WAIQ 26.3/WOW 153
Mount Cheaha – WCIQ 7.3
Operator: Alabama Educational Television Commission; Time: 24/7; Video Quality & Aspect Ratio: 480i & 16:9

Alaska 
 Anchorage – KAKM 7.2 
Juneau – KTOO-TV 3.2 (satellite of KAKM) 
 Fairbanks – 9.3

Arizona 

 Phoenix – KAET 8.2 (Arizona PBS)

Operator: Arizona State University; Time: 24/7; Video Quality & Aspect Ratio: 480i & 16:9

Arkansas 
 Arkansas PBS
 Arkadelphia – KETG 9.2
 El Dorado – KETZ 12.2
 Fayetteville – KAFT 13.2
 Jonesboro – KTEJ 19.2
 Little Rock – KETS 2.2
 Mountain View – KEMV 6.2

On Cable:

For all stations in Arkansas: Operator: Arkansas Educational Television Commission; Time: 24/7; Video Quality & Aspect Ratio: 480i & 4:3

California 
 Cotati (San Francisco Bay Area) – KRCB 22.2/Comcast 201 
Eureka – KEET 13.3 (PBS North Coast) 
Los Angeles
KCET 28.2 
KLCS 58.3/Spectrum 1271 
Redding (Chico) – KIXE-TV 9.2 
San Bernardino (Los Angeles) – KVCR-DT 24.4 (Empire KVCR) 
San Diego – KPBS 15.3 
Fresno – KVPT 18.3 (Valley PBS)

Colorado 
 Rocky Mountain PBS
 Denver – KRMA-TV 6.3
 Durango – KRMU 20.3
 Grand Junction – KRMJ 18.3
 Pueblo (Colorado Springs) – KTSC 8.3
 Steamboat Springs – KRMZ 24.3

Operator: Rocky Mountain Public Media, Inc.; Time: (8:00am–8:00pm); Video Quality & Aspect Ratio: 480i & 4:3

Florida 
 Fort Myers (Naples) – WGCU 30.3 
 Gainesville – WUFT 5.2 
 Jacksonville – WJCT 7.2 
 Orlando – WUCF-TV 24.2 
 Pensacola – WSRE 23.3 
 South Florida PBS 
 Miami – WPBT 2
 Tallahassee – WFSU-TV 11.3 
 Panama City – WFSG 56.3 (satellite of WFSU-TV) 
 Tampa – WEDU 3.6

Georgia 
 Georgia Public Broadcasting (GPB)
Athens (Atlanta) – WGTV 8.2
Chatsworth – WNGH-TV 18.2
Cochran (Macon) – WMUM-TV 29.2
Columbus – WJSP-TV 28.2
Dawson – WACS-TV 25.2
Pelham (Albany) – WABW-TV 14.2
Savannah – WVAN-TV 9.2
Waycross – WXGA-TV 8.2
Wrens (Augusta) – WCES-TV 20.2

Operator: Georgia Public Telecommunications Commission; Time: 24/7; Video Quality & Aspect Ratio: 480i & 16:9

Idaho 
 Idaho Public Television
 Boise – KAID 4.3
 Coeur d'Alene – KCDT 26.3
 Moscow – KUID 35.3
 Pocatello – KISU 10.3
 Twin Falls – KIPT 13.3

Operator: State of Idaho (Idaho State Board of Education); Time: (6:00am–12:00am); Video Quality & Aspect Ratio: 480i & 4:3

Illinois 
 Carbondale – WSIU-TV 8.3 
 Olney – WUSI-TV 16.3 (satellite of WSIU-TV) 
 Chicago – WTTW 11/Comcast 369 
 Network Knowledge 
 Jacksonville – WSEC 14.3
 Macomb – WMEC 22.3
 Quincy – WQEC 27.3
 Peoria – WTVP 47.3 
 Urbana – WILL-TV 12.3

Indiana 
 Bloomington – WTIU 30.3 
 Evansville – WNIN 9.2 
 Fort Wayne – WFWA 39.3/Comcast 242 & 1163 
 Indianapolis – WFYI 20.3 
 Muncie – WIPB 49.2/Comcast 244 
 Vincennes – WVUT 22.2

Iowa 
 Iowa PBS
 Council Bluffs (Omaha) – KBIN-TV 32.4
 Davenport (Quad Cities, Illinois/Iowa) – KQIN 36.4
 Des Moines – KDIN-TV 11.4
 Fort Dodge – KTIN 21.4
 Iowa City – KIIN 12.4
 Mason City – KYIN 24.4
 Red Oak – KHIN 36.4
 Sioux City – KSIN-TV 27.4
 Waterloo – KRIN 32.4

Operator: Iowa Public Broadcasting Board; Time: 24/7; Video Quality & Aspect Ratio: 480i & 16:9

Kansas 
 Topeka – KTWU 11.3 (w/PBS Encore) 
 Wichita – KPTS 8.3/Cox Communications 670 

 Smoky Hills PBS 
 Dodge City – KDCK 21.3
 Colby – KWKS 19.3
 Hays – KOOD 9.3
 Lakin – KSWK 3.3

Kentucky 

 Bowling Green – WKYU-TV 24.2

Louisiana 

 New Orleans – WYES-TV 12.3/Spectrum 188/Comcast 196/Cox Communications 112 
 Louisiana Public Broadcasting (LPB)
 Alexandria – KLPA-TV 25.3
 Baton Rouge – WLPB-TV 27.3
 Monroe – KLTM-TV 13.3
 Lafayette – KLPB-TV 24.3
 Lake Charles – KLTL-TV 18.3
 Shreveport – KLTS-TV 24.3

Operator: Louisiana Educational Television Authority; Time: 24/7; Video Quality & Aspect Ratio: 480i & 16:9

Maine 

 Maine Public Broadcasting Network (MPBN)
 Augusta – WCBB 10.2
 Biddeford (Portland) – WMEA-TV 26.2
 Calais – WMED-TV 13.2
 Orono (Bangor) – WMEB-TV 12.2
 Presque Isle – WMEM-TV 10.2

Operator: Maine Public Broadcasting Corporation; Time: 24/7; Video Quality & Aspect Ratio: 480i & 16:9

Maryland 

 Maryland Public Television (MPT)
 Annapolis – WMPT 22.2
 Baltimore – WMPB 67.2
 Frederick – WFPT 62.2
 Hagerstown – WWPB 31.2
 Oakland – WGPT 36.2
 Salisbury – WCPB 28.2

Operator: Maine Public Broadcasting Corporation; Time: (11:30pm–7:30pm); Video Quality & Aspect Ratio: 720p & 16:9

Massachusetts 

 WGBX-TV 44.4/Comcast 959/FiOS 474/Cox Communications 805/Spectrum 182 
 WGBY-TV 57.4

Michigan 

 Bad Axe (Flint-Saginaw-Bay City) – WDCQ-TV 19.3 (Q-TV) 
 CMU Public Television 
 Alpena – WCML-TV 6.2
 Cadillac – WCMV-TV 27.2
 Manistee – WCMW-TV 21.2
 Mount Pleasant – WCMU-TV 14.2
 Detroit – WTVS 56.3/Spectrum 156/Comcast 288 (Detroit Public TV) 
 East Lansing – WKAR-TV 23.3 
 West Michigan Public Broadcasting  
 Grand Rapids – WGVU-TV 35.3
 Kalamazoo – WGVK-TV 52.3 (satellite of WGVU-TV)

Minnesota 

 Austin (Rochester) – KSMQ-TV 15.3 
 Lakeland PBS 
 Bemidji – KAWE 9.4
 Brainerd – KAWB 22.4

 WDSE/WRPT PBS 
 Duluth – WDSE 8.3
 Hibbing – WRPT 31.3
 Pioneer PBS 
 Appleton – KWCM-TV 10.2
 Worthington – KSMN-TV 20.2

Mississippi 

 Mississippi Public Broadcasting (MPB)
 Biloxi – WMAH-TV 19.3
 Booneville – WMAE-TV 12.3
 Bude – WMAU-TV 17.3
 Greenwood – WMAO-TV 23.3
 Jackson – WMPN-TV 29.3/Comcast 201
 Meridian – WMAW-TV 14.3
 Oxford – WMAV-TV 18.3
 Starkville – WMAB-TV 2.3

Operator: Mississippi Authority for Educational Television; Time: 24/7; Video Quality & Aspect Ratio: 480i & 16:9

Missouri 

 Kansas City – KCPT 19.3/Comcast 242 
 St. Louis – KETC 9.4/Charter 184 
Sedalia (Columbia) – KMOS-TV 6.2/Spectrum Charter 184 
Ozarks Public Television 
 Joplin – KOZJ 26.3
 Springfield – KOZK 21.3

Montana 

 Montana PBS 
 Bozeman – KUSM 9.3
 Helena – KUHM-TV 10.3
 Missoula – KUFM-TV 11.3
 Billings – KBGS-TV 16.3
 Great Falls – KUGF-TV 21.3
 Kalispell – KUKL-TV 46.3

Operator: Montana State University (KUSM, KUHM), University of Montana (KUFM), and Montana University System (KBGS, KUGF, KUKL); Time: 24/7; Video Quality & Aspect Ratio: 480i & 16:9

Nebraska 

 Nebraska Public Media
 Alliance – KTNE-TV 13.3
 Bassett – KMNE-TV 7.3
 Hastings – KHNE-TV 29.3
 Lexington – KLNE-TV 3.3
 Lincoln – KUON-TV 12.3
 Merriman – KRNE-TV 12.3
 Norfolk – KXNE-TV 19.3
 North Platte – KPNE-TV 9.3
 Omaha – KYNE-TV 26.3

Operator: The University of Nebraska (KUON) and Nebraska Educational Telecommunications Commission (all except KUON); Time: 24/7; Video Quality & Aspect Ratio: 480i & 16:9

Nevada 

 Las Vegas – KLVX 10.2/Cox Communications 112 (Vegas PBS) 
Reno - KNPB 5.2/Charter 184 (PBS Reno)

New Hampshire 

 New Hampshire PBS
 Durham – WENH-TV 11.4
 Keene – WEKW-TV 11.4
 Littleton – WLED-TV 11.4
 On Cable: Comcast 959

Operator: New Hampshire Public Broadcasting; Time: 24/7; Video Quality & Aspect Ratio: 480i & 16:9

New Mexico 

 Albuquerque – KNME-TV 5.5/Comcast 397 (NM PBS)

New York 

 Binghamton – WSKG-TV 46.3/Spectrum 1276 
 Buffalo – WNED-TV 17.2/Spectrum 1275 (Buffalo-Toronto Public Media) 
 Garden City (Long Island) – WLIW 21.2/FiOS 474/Spectrum 1277 
 Rochester – WXXI-TV 21.3/Spectrum 1276 
 Schenectady (Albany) – WMHT 17
 WCWN - (ATSC 3.0 simulcast)
 Syracuse (Central New York) – WCNY-TV 24
 Watertown – WPBS-TV 16
 Norwood – WNPI-DT 18 (satellite of WPBS-TV)

References 

Create TV affiliates